Vijay C. Kumar is an Indian cinematographer, who works in the Telugu cinema. He won the Nandi Award for Best Cinematographer for the film Godavari (2006). He is the son of cinematographer C. Nageshwara Rao. Vijay Kumar's work is most noted for innovative use of lighting, subject specific visualization, use of natural colors on screen, Tele-focus shots, balancing the depth of focus between the subject and objects and many more techniques. Some of his films in Telugu cinema are Vivaha Bhojanambu, Ammoru, Agraham, Dollar Dreams, Anand and Happy Days.

Background 
C. Vijay Kumar's father, C. Nageswara Rao, was a famous cinematographer, who worked for classics like Pandava Vanavasam, Paramanandayya Sishyula Katha, Gudi Gantalu, Aastulu - Anthastulu, and Aradhana. Unfortunately Nageswara Rao expired at the age of 42, when Vijay Kumar was only seven years old. As his mother, C. Sanadhana, wanted him to carry on in his father's footsteps and continue in the same profession, he joined Sarada Enterprises (currently known as Anand Cine Services) outdoor unit at the age of thirteen as an apprentice.

Career 
Vijay Kumar worked under various cinematographers like S.Venkataratnam, V.S.R.Swami, Ravi Kanth Nagaich, S.S Lal, S.Gopal Reddy etc. in Telugu and Shomandar Roy, Eshaan Arya, Baba Azmi, Behran Mukherjee etc. in Hindi for eight years and earned lot of practical knowledge in the sense Knowledge in different kinds of lightning and exposures. In 1984 he joined as an operative cameraman under Lok Singh for Vijetha films. Producer Jaya Krishna gave Vijay Kumar his first break as cinematographer with Vivaha Bhojanambu (1988) film under Jandhyala director which was a block buster hit. He later went out to work for Neeku Naaku Pellanta with the same team.

Producer Shyam Prasad Reddy offered him to do unfinished work of Ankusam (official cinematographer was K. S. Hari). He worked for Agraham and Ammoru, which went on to be a path breaking Telugu films in terms of technical work. Later on, he went on to work many successful films like Bachelors, Sampangi, Sreevarante Mavare and Jai Bhajaranga Bhali.

He met Sekhar Kammula when they worked for Dollar Dreams which was the first film in their collaboration, following which they worked together in many successful films like Anand, Godavari, Happy Days, Leader, Life is Beautiful, Anamika and Fidaa.

Filmography 
 Love Story (2021)
Nartanasala (2018) 
 Balakrishnudu (2017)
 Fidaa (2017)
 Anamika (2014; Telugu & Tamil bilingual)
 Life is Beautiful (2012)
 Leader (2010)
 Victory (2008)
 Happy Days (2007)
 Sree Mahalakshmi
 Samanyudu (2006)
 Godavari (2006)
 Andhrudu
 Anand (2004)
 Dil (2003)
 Dollar Dreams (1999)
 Jai Bhajaranga Bhali
 Sreevarante Mavare
 Sampangi
 Prema Palaki
 Shivaji
 College
 Love
 Bachelors
 Ammoru (1995)
 Agraham
 Ankusam (1990)
 Neeku Naaku Pellanta (1988)
 Vivaha Bhojanambu (1988)

Awards
 Nandi Award for Best Cinematographer - Godavari

References

External links
 

Year of birth missing (living people)
Living people
Tamil film cinematographers
Telugu film cinematographers
Cinematographers from Andhra Pradesh
Nandi Award winners